Baha al-Din or Bahaa ad-Din, or various variants like Bahauddin, Bahaeddine or (in Turkish) Bahattin, may refer to:

Surname
A. K. M. Bahauddin, Bangladeshi politician and the Member of Parliament from Comilla
Salaheddine Bahaaeddin (born 1950), Kurdish Iraqi politician

Middle name
AFM Bahauddin Nasim, Bangladeshi politician and former Member of Parliament from Madaripur

Given name

Bahaedin Adab (1945–2007), Iranian Kurdish politician and engineer
Bahauddin Baha (born 1942), contemporary Afghan judge
Bahauddin Dagar (born 1970), Indian musician
Mufti Baha-ud-din Farooqi, contemporary Indian judge
Bahaddin Gaziyev (born 1965), Azerbaijani journalist
Rafic Hariri, full name: Rafic Baha El Deen Al-Hariri (1944–2005), Lebanese businessman and politician
Bahaa el-Din Ahmed Hussein el-Akkad (born 1949), Egyptian former Muslim sheikh who converted to Christianity
Qawwal Bahauddin Khan (1934–2006), Pakistani musician
Bahattin Köse (born 1990), Turkish-German footballer
Behaeddin Shakir, aka Bahattin Şakir (1874–1922), Turkish political activist
Bahattin Sofuoğlu (1978–2002), Turkish motor cycle racer
Bahattin Sofuoğlu (2003) (born 2003), Turkish motor cycle racer

Religious honorific name (laqab)
Baha al-Din al-Muqtana (d. c. 1042), founder of the Druze Faith
 Baha al-Din Qaraqush (d. 1201), military commander under Saladin
Baha ad-Din ibn Shaddad (1145–1234), jurist and scholar, biographer of Saladin
Baha-ud-din Zakariya (c. 1170 – 1268), Sufi teacher
Baha' al-din Zuhair (1186–1258), Arabian poet
Baha-ud-Din Naqshband Bukhari (1318–1389), founder of Sufi Muslim order, the Naqshbandi
Baha' ad-Din al-`Amili (1547–1621), Persian and Lebanese scholar and poet
Rahmizâde Bâhâeddin Bediz (Rahmi Bediz since 1934; 1875–1951), Turkish photographer

Places
Mandi Bahauddin, town and district in Pakistan

See also
 Baha (name)

Arabic masculine given names
Turkish_masculine_given_names